Allaxitheca is a monotypic moth genus in the family Geometridae described by Warren in 1897. Its only species, Allaxitheca purpurascens, was first described by Frederic Moore in 1888.

References

Ennominae
Geometridae genera
Monotypic moth genera